Michael Anthony Samuels (born 1939) is a non career appointee American Ambassador to Sierra Leone (1975-1979).

Taylor soon left government service only to return as Deputy US Trade Representative and Ambassador to the GATT from early 1986 to mid-1989.

Samuels graduated from Yale University in 1962 with an American Studies major.  Desiring to teach in Africa but not feeling qualified, he attended a new program at Columbia University’s Teachers College where he earned a Masters Degree and class room experience in the British educational system.  From there, he taught at a school in Northern Nigeria from 1962-1964.  Samuels later earned his PhD from Columbia University in African History, writing his dissertation, which focused on Angola, entirely in Portuguese.

References

Teachers College, Columbia University alumni
Yale College alumni
Schoolteachers from New York (state)
Ambassadors of the United States to Sierra Leone
General Agreement on Tariffs and Trade
1939 births
Living people
20th-century American diplomats